The Walter NZ 60 was a five-cylinder, air-cooled, radial engine for aircraft use built in Czechoslovakia by Walter Aircraft Engines in the 1920s.

Applications
 Albert A-20
 ANBO II
 Avia BH-9
 Avia BH-10
 Avia BH-11
 Avia BH-12
 DUS III Ptapta
 Gribovsky G-8
 Kalinin K-9
 Pander E

Specifications

See also

References

 
 Němeček, V. (1968). Československá letadla. Praha: Naše Vojsko.

1920s aircraft piston engines
Aircraft air-cooled radial piston engines
NZ 60